"Oliver Twist" is a song by Nigerian singer-songwriter D'banj. The track was first released in the United Kingdom on 11 May 2012, as the first single from DB Records' compilation album, D'Kings Men (2013). For the chart week dated 26 May, "Oliver Twist" debuted at number nine on the UK Singles Chart—marking the musician's first chart appearance and first Nigerian song to ever debut on the chart. Lyrically, the song expresses D'banj's crave for more women, relating to how the fictional character Oliver Twist asked for more gruel.

Track listing

Critical reception
Robert Copsey of Digital Spy gave the song a positive review, stating:
As such, his first release on these shores is a confident debut. "I have a confession," he admits over a hypnotic, afrobeat-meets-hip-hop riff, before reeling off a list of famous ladies he wouldn't mind getting better acquainted with – including Beyoncé, Rihanna and Nicki Minaj ("her yansh is bigger," after all). Given it's near-impossible to resist the hip-shaking melody and bum-wobbling hooks, we can't imagine he'll have much trouble winning them over.

Music video

A music video, directed by Sesan Ogunro, to accompany the release of "Oliver Twist" was first released onto YouTube on 19 March 2012. The video itself runs for a total of three minutes and fifty-five seconds and sees the artist, D'banj, performing the track in an empty studio designed as a run down home. It is performed in the key of G# Minor throughout the entire song. A member of D'banj's live set (David Vujanic) makes an appearance dressed as Oliver Twist, whilst the CEO Dancers (three female dancers) perform to the track. In August 2013, the music video surpassed 21.5 million views making it the Nigerian song with highest number of views on YouTube at the time. , it has more than 53 million views. The video features cameos from D'banj's GOOD Music label mates Big Sean, Pusha T, GOOD Music producer Hit-Boy and the label's founder Kanye West; whilst Mike Dean, Bricka Bricka, Eddie Kadi, Sneakbo and Keisha Buchanan of MKS fame also make cameos.

Accolades
The music video for "Oliver Twist" won Most Gifted Male Video and Most Gifted Video of the Year at the 2012 Channel O Music Video Awards. The song won Song of the Year and was nominated for Best Pop Single at The Headies 2012. D'banj received the Best Male West Africa nomination at the 2012 Kora Awards for Oliver Twist. Furthermore, the song was nominated in the Hottest Single of the Year category at the 2012 Nigeria Entertainment Awards. It was also nominated for World's Best Song and World's Best Video at the 2014 World Music Awards.

Charts

Chart performance
"Oliver Twist" made its first chart appearance on the chart week dated 26 May 2012—where it debuted at number nine on the UK Singles Chart; as the second highest new entry after The Saturdays "30 Days" (#7). The track also debuted at number two on the UK R&B Chart for the same charting week. "Oliver Twist" spent only one week inside the UK top 10, falling four places to number thirteen on its second charting week—and as of the week dated 20 August has spent thirteen consecutive weeks inside the top 75.

Certifications

Release history

See also
 List of UK top 10 singles in 2012
 List of Airplay 100 number ones of the 2010s

References

2012 singles
D'banj songs
Sneakbo songs
Song recordings produced by Don Jazzy
Works based on Oliver Twist
2011 songs
Mercury Records singles
Number-one singles in Romania